Sid Mittra (born 13 May 1930) is an emeritus professor of finance at Oakland University in Rochester, Michigan and the founder of financial consulting firm Mittra and Associates. He is also a former board member of the International Board  of Standards and Practices of Certified Financial Planners. He has also been a presenter at World Conference of the International Association for Financial Planning. He is the author of a textbook on financial planning titled Practicing Financial Planning

Early life 
Sid Mittra was born in the small town of Benaras. After completing his undergraduate degree from St. Johns College, he enrolled in a masters program at Dayanand Anglo Vedic College (or D.A.V. College). After the completion of his masters program he moved to Bombay as a research assistant in the Reserve Bank of India. He was awarded a Fulbright Grant and went to University of Florida to pursue his PhD in economics.

Professional life 
After completing his PhD, Mittra taught at the University of Detroit. After working for the United Nations for an assignment, Mittra became an associate professor at Oakland University in Rochester, Michigan, before changing his research orientation from economics to finance. Mittra subsequently joined the Board of Certified Financial Planners and published a textbook on personal finance entitled, Practicing Financial Planning: A Complete Guide for Professionals, parts of which won a gold in Axiom Business Book Award in 2008. His other publications include Investment Analysis and Portfolio Management, Inside Wall Street, Money and Banking: Theory, Analysis and Policy, and Dimensions in Macroeconomics: A Book of Readings.

Mittra founded a boutique financial planning business called Coordinated Financial Planning, later renamed Mittra & Associates. He also became a member of the International CFP Board.

In his retirement, Mittra wrote an autobiography titled To Bee or Not To Bee.

References 

1930 births
Living people
Oakland University faculty
American finance and investment writers